Andrew Warde (1597–1659) was a colonist, judge, farmer, and a founding father of the Connecticut towns of Wethersfield, Stamford, and Fairfield.

Life
Andrew Warde was born in Sheffield, England, in 1597. He emigrated to New England with the Winthrop Fleet sometime around 1630. In Watertown, Massachusetts, Warde assumed early prominence as a man of affairs; he was made a freeman of the town on May 14, 1634. His name is recorded in the second book of inventory, as having "an homestall of 10 acres, by estimation". He held this estate until 1642, some seven or more years after he had left Watertown. By 1640, Warde also owned over 350 acres of land in Weathersfield.

A historical marker in Wethersfield, CT credits Andrew Ward with the other nine adventurers who founded arguably the oldest English town in Connecticut. "In 1634, at a deep bend in the Connecticut River, John Oldham and nine other adventurers from Watertown, Massachusetts were welcomed by the Wongunk Indians, anxious to trade beaver pelts. Marsh hay in the low meadows and the rich alluvial soil soon attracted settlers who planted their farms on the broad terrace above the River. The surrounding forest gave up timber for houses, and the town was laid out with a Common alongside the present Cove. The settlers named the town Wethersfield. At that time it included the parishes of Rocky Hill to the south, Newington to the west, and Glastonbury to the east, across the river, where they pastured their livestock."

In 1635-6, he was one of several (eight) persons granted to govern the people at Connecticut by the general court of Mass. Bay colony under Gov. Winthrop, as mentioned on the memorial.

Along with other founders of Connecticut he likely attended the meeting that resulted in the Fundamental Orders.

In 1640, he founded and settled the plantation of Toquams (later called Samford) that had recently been purchased from the Natives. There he was the Constable (1642) and then Magistrate (1647). His final settlement was in Fairfield.

Legacy
On June 13, 1907, a monument to Andrew Ward was unveiled in Fairfield cemetery, and a speech was made in celebration of his life by Henry C. Sturges, Esq.

References

Sources 

1659 deaths
People of colonial Connecticut
People of colonial Massachusetts
Year of birth uncertain
Lawyers from Fairfield, Connecticut
1597 births